Tong Fong Tsuen is a village in Ping Shan, Yuen Long District, Hong Kong.

Administration
Tong Fong Tsuen is a recognized village under the New Territories Small House Policy.

History
Tong Fong Tsuen is one of the three wais (walled villages) and six tsuens (villages) established by the Tang Clan of Ping Shan, namely: Sheung Cheung Wai, Kiu Tau Wai, Fui Sha Wai, Hang Tau Tsuen, Hang Mei Tsuen, Tong Fong Tsuen, San Tsuen, Hung Uk Tsuen and San Hei Tsuen.

At the time of the 1911 census, the population of Tong Fong was 148. The number of males was 83.

See also
 Ping Shan Heritage Trail
 Tong Fong Tsuen stop

References

External links

 Delineation of area of existing village Tong Fong Tsuen (Ping Shan) for election of resident representative (2019 to 2022)
 Antiquities and Monuments Office. Hong Kong Traditional Chinese Architectural Information System. Tong Fong Tsuen
 Antiquities Advisory Board. Historic Building Appraisal. Entrance Hall, Shut Hing Study Hall, Tong Fong Tsuen Pictures

Villages in Yuen Long District, Hong Kong
Ping Shan